Luca Cristian Andronache (born 26 July 2003) is a Romanian professional footballer who plays as a winger for Liga I side Farul Constanța.

Club career

Viitorul Constanta
He made his league debut on 5 August 2020 in Liga I match against FC Dinamo Bucuresti.

Personal life
Luca Andronache is the son of football manager and former football player Vergil Andronache.

Career statistics

Club

References

External links
 
 
 

2003 births
Living people
Romanian footballers
Romania youth international footballers
Association football midfielders
Liga I players
Liga III players
FC Viitorul Constanța players
FCV Farul Constanța players